This article deals with cooperation between the European Union and non-member states. For the use of the term to describe Franco-German cooperation at and since the Treaty of Maastricht, see France–Germany relations 

Privileged partnership is a generic term for cooperation between the European Union and a non-EU country to advance common goals without using EU membership.

History
The term is usually used to describe an alternative to EU membership for Turkey that was first floated in November 2002 by Heinrich August Winkler in Die Zeit and later formally proposed in 2004, although the term was used previously in 2003 to describe a proposed relationship with Russia  and was also used in 2004 for a proposed relationship with Israel. 

Since that time, the term has been used for alternatives for EU membership for Albania, Bosnia and Herzegovina, Croatia, Macedonia, Serbia and Montenegro and Kosovo, has since been used retrospectively  to characterise relationships with the countries considered in 2004 for the European Neighbourhood Policy that were first proposed in the Commission Communication of March 2003, and is also used for the EU's bilateral relationship with Tunisia and with Russia. 

Ultimately the term dates back to 1957 when it was used to characterise Morocco's relationship with the European Economic Community.

By country

Albania
The term was used for a proposed alternative to EU membership for Albania.

Algeria
The term has been used for the proposed relationship with the countries considered in 2004 for the European Neighbourhood Policy, including Algeria.

Armenia 
The term has been used for the proposed relationship with the countries considered in 2004 for the European Neighbourhood Policy, including Armenia.

Azerbaijan 
The term has been used for the proposed relationship with the countries considered in 2004 for the European Neighbourhood Policy, including Azerbaijan.

Belarus 
The term has been used for the proposed relationship with the countries considered in 2004 for the European Neighbourhood Policy, including Belarus.

Bosnia and Herzegovina
The term was used for a proposed alternative to EU membership for Bosnia and Herzegovina.

Croatia
The term was used for a proposed alternative to EU membership for Croatia. The option was dropped in favor of full membership. Croatia joined the union in July 2013.

Egypt 
The term has been used for the proposed relationship with the countries considered in 2004 for the European Neighbourhood Policy, including Egypt.

North Macedonia
The term was used for a proposed alternative to EU membership for North Macedonia.

Georgia 
The term has been used for the proposed relationship with the countries considered in 2004 for the European Neighbourhood Policy, including Georgia.

Israel
The term was used by Spanish foreign minister Miguel Ángel Moratinos, who spoke out for a "privileged partnership, offering all the benefits of EU membership, without participation in the institutions" for Israel. It was also used for the proposed relationship with the countries considered in 2004 for the European Neighbourhood Policy, including Israel.

Jordan 
The term has been used for the proposed relationship with the countries considered in 2004 for the European Neighbourhood Policy, including Jordan.

Kosovo
The term was used for a proposed alternative to EU membership for Kosovo.

Lebanon 
The term has been used for the proposed relationship with the countries considered in 2004 for the European Neighbourhood Policy, including Lebanon.

Libya 
The term has been used for the proposed relationship with the countries considered in 2004 for the European Neighbourhood Policy, including Libya.

Moldova 
The term has been used for the proposed relationship with the countries considered in 2004 for the European Neighbourhood Policy, including Moldova.

Morocco 
The term has been used for the proposed relationship with the countries considered in 2004 for the European Neighbourhood Policy, including Morocco.

Palestine 
The term has been used for the proposed relationship with the countries considered in 2004 for the European Neighbourhood Policy, including the Palestinian Authority.

Russia
French President Jacques Chirac used the term for a proposed Russia-EU relationship at the Russia-EU summit in 2003.

Serbia and Montenegro
The term was used for a proposed alternative to EU membership for Serbia and Montenegro.

Syria 
The term has been used for the proposed relationship with the countries considered in 2004 for the European Neighbourhood Policy, including Syria.

Tunisia 
The term has been used for the proposed relationship with the countries considered in 2004 for the European Neighbourhood Policy, including Tunisia.

Turkey
Privileged partnership was the term used by Angela Merkel in February 2004 to describe a future relationship between Turkey and the European Union which fell short of full membership. The proposal was advanced by CDU/CSU members.

Ukraine 
The term has been used for the proposed relationship with the countries considered in 2004 for the European Neighbourhood Policy, including Ukraine.

United Kingdom
The term was used by Jacques Delors for a proposed relationship between the European Union and the United Kingdom should it exit the EU.

References

See also 
 Accession of Turkey to the European Union
 Enlargement of the European Union
 Future enlargement of the European Union

Third-country relations of the European Union